Khordad is the third month of the Solar Hijri calendar. Khordad has thirty-one days. It begins in May and ends in June by the Gregorian calendar. Khordad is the third month of the spring season (Bahar). It is followed by Tir. The Afghan Persian name is Jawzā. The name is derived from the deity name Haurvatat.

Events 
2-3 - 1244  - Grand Review of the Armies
16 - 1323 - the Normandy landings of 1944 take place in the beaches of northern Normandy in France.
12 - 1325 - 1946 Italian institutional referendum
16 - 1325 - The National Basketball Association is officially founded with Maurice Podoloff, concurrent president of the American Hockey League, as its founding president.
6 - 1371 - 22 English football teams, which had left the ranks of the English Football League in 1370-71, form an independent Premier League in the UK, becoming the top tier pro football league of English football. The new league's first games are slated for 24 Mordad.
11 - 1380 - Nepalese royal massacre

Deaths 

 2 – 1390 – Nasser Hejazi, an Iranian football player and coach.
 12 – 1392 – Jalal Al-Din Taheri, Iranian scholar, theologian and Islamic philosopher.
 16 – 1383 – Ronald Reagan, 40th president of the United States
 25 – 1391 – Hassan Kassai, Iranian iconic master of Persian classical music.
 27 – 1392 – Jalil Shahnaz, Iranian maestros.
 31 – 1392 – Abdol-Aziz Mirza Farmanfarmaian, Iranian architect.

Observances 
 Victoria Day - First Monday of Khordad
 Memorial Day - First or Second Monday of Khordad
 Canadian Armed Forces Day - Third Sunday of Khordad
 King's Official Birthday - Fourth Saturday of Khordad
 Khordadegan - 6 Khordad
 Festa della Repubblica - 12 or 13 Khordad
 Constitution Day (Denmark) - 15 Khordad (14 in leap years)
 National Day of Sweden - 16/17 Khordad
 Russia Day and Independence Day (Philippines) - 22/23 Khordad
 Flag Day (United States) - 24 or 25 Khordad

References 

Months of the Iranian calendar